Abhijeet Khandkekar is a RJ, anchor and Marathi television and film actor, known for Mazhya Navryachi Bayko and Maziya Priyala Preet Kalena. Currently He is playing role of Malhar Kamat in Star Pravah's TV series Tuzech Mi Geet Gaat Aahe.

Personal life 
Khandkekar married Sukhada Khandkekar in 2013, who is also an actor.

Media image 
He was ranked twentieth in The Times of India's Top 20 Most Desirable Men of Maharashtra in 2017. He was ranked eleventh in The Times of India's Top 15 Most Desirable Men on Marathi Television in 2018. He was ranked twentieth in The Times of India's Top 30 Most Desirable Men of Maharashtra in 2019.

Career 
Khandkekar was born on 7 July 1986 in Nashik, Maharashtra and got his first break in Maziya Priyala Preet Kalena which was aired on Zee Marathi in 2010–2011. He made his debut in film with Jai Maharashtra Dhaba Bhatinda film. He has also played various roles in Bhay, Baba, Me Pan Sachin, Mamachya Gavala Jaaoo Yaa, etc. He was last seen in Zee Marathi serial Mazhya Navryachi Bayko from 2016-2021.

Filmography

Television

Films

Web series

Awards and nominations

References

External links 
 Abhijeet Khandkekar on IMDb

Marathi actors
Living people
1986 births
Male actors in Marathi television
Male actors in Marathi cinema